COTN may refer to:

 Children of the Nations, charity
 Church of the Nazarene, religious denomination
 Creatures of the Night, 1982 album by Kiss
Crypt of the Necrodancer

See also
 Creature of the night (disambiguation)